John Covode (March 17, 1808 – January 11, 1871) was an American businessman and abolitionist politician. He served three terms in the United States House of Representatives from Pennsylvania.

Early life
Covode was born in Fairfield Township, Westmoreland County, Pennsylvania. He worked for several years on his father's farm, served an apprenticeship to a blacksmith, and then was employed at a woolen mill in Lockport, Pennsylvania. He became owner of the woolen mill and attained considerable wealth as a woolen manufacturer. Other business interests included the Westmoreland Coal Company, where he served as the first president of the company in 1854. He served for two terms in the Pennsylvania Legislature(House of Representatives).  Two attempts to enter the Pennsylvania Senate were unsuccessful.

United States House of Representatives
In 1854, he was elected to Congress as an Opposition Party candidate.

After joining the Republican Party, he was re-elected to the 35th Congress in 1856. He was a strong supporter of the Freedmen's Bureau, the Civil Rights Act of 1866, and the Reconstruction Acts. He attended the Union National Convention in Philadelphia in 1866. On February 21, 1868, Covode introduced a resolution in the House of Representatives to impeach President Andrew Johnson. A slightly-amended version of this resolution, was passed by the House on February 24, 1868, thereby impeaching Johnson, but the Senate did not vote to convict him in his his impeachment trial.

Committees
He served as chairman of the United States House Committee on Public Expenditures from 1857 until 1859 and the United States House Committee on Public Buildings and Grounds from 1867 until 1869. He also served on the United States Congressional Joint Committee on the Conduct of the War, in reference to the American Civil War.

Covode Committee
Covode is most famous for chairing a committee to investigate the possibility of impeaching President James Buchanan during the spring and summer of 1860. Officially titled the United States House Select Committee to Investigate Alleged Corruptions in Government, it is more popularly known as the Covode Committee after him.

United States House election, 1870
Covode contested with Henry D. Foster the election to the Forty-first Congress, neither being sworn pending the contest, as no credentials were issued by the Governor. On February 9, 1870, the House declared him duly elected, whereupon he qualified and served until his death. Covode died in Harrisburg, Pennsylvania, aged 62.

Family
His oldest son, George H. Covode (1835–1864), was a colonel in the Union Army during the Civil War. He died on June 25, 1864, after being shot in the arm and stomach by Confederate troops he had mistaken for Unionists.

See also
List of United States Congress members who died in office (1790–1899)

References

External links

Biography from Spartacus Educational
The Political Graveyard

Papers of John Covode - People's Contest Website

Bibliography

Chester, Edward W. "The Impact of the Covode Congressional Investigation." Western Pennsylvania Historical Magazine 42 (December 1959): 343-50
Baker, Jean H.: James Buchanan, Times Books: 2004

1808 births
1871 deaths
People from Adams County, Pennsylvania
Pennsylvania Whigs
Members of the Pennsylvania House of Representatives
Opposition Party members of the United States House of Representatives from Pennsylvania
Republican Party members of the United States House of Representatives from Pennsylvania
American abolitionists
Politicians from Harrisburg, Pennsylvania
People from Westmoreland County, Pennsylvania
People of Pennsylvania in the American Civil War
19th-century American politicians
Impeachment of Andrew Johnson